Baboucarr Savage (born June 7, 1992) is a Gambian footballer who last played for Los Angeles Misioneros and the Gambia national football team. Savage made his debut for the Gambia national team in 2012 in a 2013 Africa Cup of Nations qualifier against Algeria.

At the youth level he played in the 2009 FIFA U-17 World Cup.

References

1992 births
Living people
Gambian footballers
The Gambia international footballers
Gambian expatriate footballers
Expatriate soccer players in the United States
Gambian expatriate sportspeople in the United States
Association football midfielders
The Gambia youth international footballers
Real de Banjul FC players